The 1984 United States presidential election in Arkansas took place on November 6, 1984. All fifty states and the District of Columbia, were part of the 1984 United States presidential election. State voters chose six electors to the Electoral College, which selected the president and vice president of the United States.

Arkansas was won by incumbent United States President Ronald Reagan of California, who was running against former Vice President Walter Mondale of Minnesota. Reagan ran for a second time with former C.I.A. Director George H. W. Bush of Texas, and Mondale ran with Representative Geraldine Ferraro of New York, the first major female candidate for the vice presidency.

The presidential election of 1984 was a very partisan election for Arkansas, with just under 99% of the electorate voting only either Democratic or Republican, although a total of ten parties appeared on the ballot. The vast majority of counties in Arkansas voted for Reagan in a particularly strong turnout, even in this typically conservative-leaning state. A bloc of heavily African-American counties in the southeastern Delta region turned out in majority for Mondale.

Arkansas weighed in for this election as 2 percentage points more Republican than the national average. , this is the last election in which St. Francis County voted for a Republican presidential candidate.

Reagan won the election in Arkansas with a resounding 22-point landslide. While Arkansas typically voted conservative at the time, the election results in Arkansas are also reflective of a nationwide reconsolidation of the base for the Republican Party which took place through the 1980s; called by Reagan the "second American Revolution." This was most evident during the 1984 presidential election. Arkansas continued in this election as a component of the Republican stronghold of the Deep South, which is evident after the presidency of Jimmy Carter.

It is speculated that Mondale lost support with voters nearly immediately during the campaign, namely during his acceptance speech at the 1984 Democratic National Convention. There he stated that he intended to increase taxes. To quote Mondale, "By the end of my first term, I will reduce the Reagan budget deficit by two thirds. Let's tell the truth. It must be done, it must be done. Mr. Reagan will raise taxes, and so will I. He won't tell you. I just did."  Despite this claimed attempt at establishing truthfulness with the electorate, this claim to raise taxes badly eroded his chances in what had already begun as an uphill battle against the charismatic Ronald Reagan. Reagan also enjoyed high levels of bipartisan support during the 1984 presidential election, both in Arkansas, and across the nation at large. Many registered Democrats who voted for Reagan (Reagan Democrats) stated that they had chosen to do so because they associated him with the economic recovery, because of his strong stance on national security issues with Russia, and because they considered the Democrats as "supporting American poor and minorities at the expense of the middle class."  These public opinion factors contributed to Reagan's 1984 landslide victory, in Arkansas and elsewhere.

Results

Results by county

See also
 United States presidential elections in Arkansas
 Presidency of Ronald Reagan

References

Arkansas
1984
1984 Arkansas elections